Monstera is a genus of 59 species of flowering plants in the arum family, Araceae, native to tropical regions of the Americas.

Etymology 
The genus is named from the Latin word for "monstrous" or "abnormal", and refers to the unusual leaves with natural holes that members of the genus have.

Description

Growth pattern 
Since the plant roots both into the soil and over trees, it is considered a hemiepiphyte.

Leaves 
The fenestrated leaves allow for the leaves to spread over greater area to increase sunlight exposure, and to allow light to reach other leaves below, by using less energy to produce and maintain the leaves.

Inflorescence 

Uses 

They are commonly grown indoors as houseplants. The best-known representative of the genus, Monstera deliciosa, is also cultivated for its edible fruit which tastes like a combination of banana and pineapple.

Species
 Plants of the World Online recognises 59 accepted taxa (of 49 species and 6 infraspecific names):

 Monstera acacoyaguensis  
 Monstera acuminata  – Shingle plant
 Monstera adansonii  
 Monstera adansonii subsp. adansonii  
 Monstera adansonii subsp. blanchetii  
 Monstera adansonii subsp. klotzschiana  
 Monstera adansonii subsp. laniata 
 Monstera alcirana  
 Monstera amargalensis  
 Monstera anomala  
 Monstera aureopinnata  
 Monstera barrieri  
 Monstera boliviana  
 Monstera buseyi  
 Monstera cenepensis   
 Monstera costaricensis 
 Monstera croatii  
 Monstera deliciosa  – Ceriman, Swiss-cheese plant
 Monstera dissecta  
 Monstera dubia  
 Monstera egregia 
 Monstera epipremnoides  
 Monstera filamentosa  
 Monstera florescanoana 
 Monstera gambensis 
 Monstera Gentryi  
 Monstera glaucescens  
 Monstera gracilis  
 Monstera guzmanjacobiae 
 Monstera integrifolia  
 Monstera juliusii 
 Monstera kikiae 
 Monstera kessleri  
 Monstera lechleriana  
 Monstera lentii  
 Monstera limitaris  
 Monstera luteynii  
 Monstera maderaverde  
 Monstera membranacea  
 Monstera minima 
 Monstera mittermeieri  
 Monstera molinae 
 Monstera momoi  
 Monstera monteverdensis 
 Monstera obliqua  
 Monstera oreophila  
 Monstera pinnatipartita  
 Monstera pittieri  
 Monstera planadensis  
 Monstera praetermissa  
 Monstera punctulata  
 Monstera siltepecana  
 Monstera spruceana  
 Monstera standleyana  
 Monstera subpinnata  
 Monstera tacanaensis 
 Monstera tarrazuensis 
 Monstera tenuis  
 Monstera tuberculata  
 Monstera tuberculata var. brevinoda  
 Monstera tuberculata var. tuberculata
 Monstera vasquezii 
 Monstera wilsoniensis  
 Monstera xanthospatha  

Previously included:
 Monstera alticola  
 Monstera bocatorana  
 Monstera coloradensis 
 Monstera fortunense  
 Monstera gigantea (Roxb.) Schott - Epipremnum giganteum (Roxb.) Schott
 Monstera jefense  
 Monstera pirrense  
Commonly misidentified as Monstera:

 Rhaphidophora tetrasperma
 Thaumatophyllum bipinnatifidum

References

External links
Aroid Society

 
Araceae genera
Taxa named by Michel Adanson